Petrovka is a rural locality (a selo) and the administrative center of Petrovskoye Rural Settlement, Prokhorovsky District, Belgorod Oblast, Russia. The population was 160 as of 2010. There is 1 street.

Geography 
Petrovka is located 26 km northeast of Prokhorovka (the district's administrative centre) by road. Radkovka is the nearest rural locality.

References 

Rural localities in Prokhorovsky District